Gardan Kolah (also Romanized as Gardan Kolāh) is a village in Mashayekh Rural District, Doshman Ziari District, Mamasani County, Fars Province, Iran. At the 2016 census, its population was 16, in 5 families.

References 

Populated places in Mamasani County